Guilherme dos Santos Rodrigues (born 9 May 1998), commonly known as Miranda, is a Brazilian footballer who currently plays as a midfielder for Estrela da Amadora.

Career statistics

Club

Notes

References

1998 births
Living people
Brazilian footballers
Brazilian expatriate footballers
Association football midfielders
Associação Ferroviária de Esportes players
Coritiba Foot Ball Club players
S.C. Covilhã players
C.F. Estrela da Amadora players
Liga Portugal 2 players
Campeonato de Portugal (league) players
Brazilian expatriate sportspeople in Portugal
Expatriate footballers in Portugal